The commune Itaba is one of 11 municipalities in the province of Gitega, Burundi. It is surrounded in the north by the town Gitega, to the south by Rutana Province, to the west by the municipalities Bukirasazi and Makebuko, to the east by Rutana and Ruyigi provinces.

Climate
The climate is tropical and is moderated by altitude. Under normal conditions, the dry season is from three to four months from June to September. In general, the climate is mild with regular and abundant rainfall. The annual average temperature is 19.7 °C (average maximum 25.5 °C, minimum average 13.8 °C). Generally, temperatures do not experience significant changes in year.

Demographics
The municipality has 54,793 inhabitants living in 10,759 households, with a density average of 322 inhabitants / km2,  27% lower than the density of the Gitega province whose density is 349 inhabitants per km2 on average.

Administrative structure
Zones and administrative divisions
 ZONE BUHEVYI
 Kagoma
 Kanyonga
 Rukobe II
 Rukobe I
 ZONE GIHAMAGARA
 Buhinda
 Gihamagara
 Kibogoye
 Kirambi
 Kugitega
 Mugomera
 Ruhanza
 ZONE ITABA
 Buhanga
 Butare
 Gisikara
 Itaba
5.Kanyinya
6.Karemba
7.Macu
8.Mutanga
9.Nkima

Economy

Agriculture

The Itaba municipality belongs to two natural regions: Kirimiro and Buyogoma.
Its soil, its population, its diverse climate and hydrography give it a framework
favorable for intensive and varied agriculture. Agriculture covers 90% of the population. It produces food crops, industrial and a little less of vegetable crops and fruit. The production is traditional, with small family farms land (40 acres per household), rudimentary tools, family labor and production mainly for home consumption. Crops are associated that is to say, they practice mixed farming on the same field up to four crops: example: beans, corn, taro, banana.
The municipality has three seasons: A: September to February, favorable especially for corn,- B: that is to say, from February to July, with good harvest of beans, and season C in bogs. From May to December: one sows beans, corn, sweet potato. This counts for all the regions in Burundi.
Agriculture of the Itaba municipality is based mainly on the work of women. They plow, sow, weed, harvest and transport crops. The men work mainly for some special crops destined for immediate cash-yielding, livestock and making banana beer.
Nevertheless, this situation is going to change soon. With the government committed to the mechanization of the agriculture, machinery will replace the traditional hoe leaving a space to modern life-style and market-oriented agricultural production.

Livestock
The Itaba Municipality has a natural environment with abundant natural pastures that can yet be improved. People can also count on the tradition that has seen the municipality of Itaba emerging as one of the most important breeding sites of Burundi throughout the ages.
Livestock that has long been seen as a prestigious matter in the municipality of Itaba and in the whole province of Gitega, as it mainly conferred a social status, is now embracing a new era: Zero-grazing, Green-Itaba Municipality, Market-oriented breeding. The livestock is made essentially of: cattle, sheep, goats, pigs and poultry.
Traditionally, cows, goats, sheep, were driven to the mountain pastures and valleys for grazing. Very few people made a permanent stall. But as it has been said above, many breeders have now made the politics of zero-grazing theirs, and the results are rather promising: milk production has seen an exponential production that could lead to an implementation of a milk-processing plant in the commune in the foreseeable future.

Food Industry
 Agakura Project (Food and beverage: Production and transformation of fruit and breeding derivatives)
 Location: Gihamagara, number of employees 50-200 since 1995
 SOGESTAL Kirimiro
 The RUKOBE coffee washing station
 The MAHONDA coffee washing station

Education
Schools and universities:

References

External links
 https://web.archive.org/web/20140407094912/http://www.leburundi.net/download/gitega/commune_itaba.pdf

Communes of Burundi
Gitega Province